Per Malcolm Svensson (25 October 1885 – 19 March 1961) was a Swedish track and field athlete who competed in the 1920 Summer Olympics. In 1920 he finished fourth in the hammer throw competition and fifth in the 56 pound weight throw event.

References

External links
Profile 

1885 births
1961 deaths
Swedish male hammer throwers
Olympic athletes of Sweden
Athletes (track and field) at the 1920 Summer Olympics
Olympic weight throwers